Phillip O. Berry Academy of Technology (also known as Berry or POB) is a magnet high school located in Charlotte, North Carolina, USA. It is part of the Charlotte-Mecklenburg School System (CMS) and was opened in 2003. The mascot is a cardinal and the school colors are appropriately black and red (rarely, white and gold are thrown into the mix when more colors are necessary). The school is named after the educational activist Phillip O. Berry (1940–1984). The overall mission statement is that education will be centered on a rigorous and relevant curriculum with focused human relations between students, parents, staff and the community. The school has a student body of 1,800–2,000 students, housed in a  building.

Berry Academy is the only school in Mecklenburg County to offer AP Earth/Environmental course to freshman students. It is recognized as one of the few full magnet high schools in CMS. The school and Harding University High School are both located on Alleghany Street. As rivals, whenever Berry Academy and Harding U face each other in aa American football game it is known as the "Battle of Alleghany".

The school offers a rigorous and relevant technical curriculum that is divided into three career academies, where students place themselves based upon their interests: the academies of engineering, information technology and medical sciences and biotechnology. Programs not available at most other CMS high schools include biotechnology, advanced biotechnology, oracle database programming, automotive, construction, civil and electrical engineering technology and computer engineering technology.

In 2010, Phillip O. Berry was one of only six schools in the United States to win the National School Change Award due to significant improvement.

Notable alumni 
 Khalia Braswell, computer scientist, technologist, founder of INTech
 Dajuan Graf, professional basketball player
 Alex Lake, contestant on season 1 of The Circle on Netflix

References

External links 
 

Public high schools in North Carolina
Educational institutions established in 1951
Schools in Charlotte, North Carolina
Magnet schools in North Carolina
1951 establishments in North Carolina